Elizat Abdureshit (born 1 February 2000) is a Chinese footballer currently playing as a forward for Xinjiang Tianshan Leopard.

Career statistics

Club
.

References

2000 births
Living people
Chinese footballers
Association football forwards
China League One players
Xinjiang Tianshan Leopard F.C. players